In mathematics, Khabibullin's conjecture, named after B. N. Khabibullin, is related to Paley's problem for plurisubharmonic functions and to various extremal problems in the theory of entire functions of several variables.

The first statement in terms of logarithmically convex functions 
Khabibullin's conjecture (version 1, 1992). Let  be a non-negative increasing function on the half-line  such that . If 

then

This statement of the Khabibullin's conjecture completes his survey.

Relation to Euler's Beta function 
The product in the right hand side of the inequality is related to the Euler's Beta function :

Discussion 

For each fixed  the function

The second statement in terms of increasing functions 
Khabibullin's conjecture (version 2). If

then

The third statement in terms of non-negative functions 
Khabibullin's conjecture (version 3). If 

then

See also
Logarithmically convex function

References 

Conjectures
Inequalities